Kammron Taylor (born August 28, 1984) is an American professional basketball player who last played for the Saint John Riptide of the National Basketball League of Canada. He played college basketball for the University of Wisconsin–Madison.

Early life
Taylor played basketball with his older brother, Kerek, in their garage in the backyard of their home in Minneapolis, Minnesota. Their father, Kenneth, kept the garage pitch black so the brothers would learn to dribble without seeing the ball. He attended North Community High School where he played basketball, football and tennis.

College career
Taylor was an honorable mention all-conference pick as a junior with the Wisconsin Badgers, when he averaged 14.2 points, 3.0 rebounds and 2.4 assists per game. After struggling late in the season, he improved his diet and entered his senior year more muscular.

In his senior season, he was named to the All-Big Ten second team and the Big Ten All-Tournament team. In 36 games, he averaged 13.3 points, 2.3 rebounds and 1.9 assists per game.

Professional career
After going undrafted in the 2007 NBA draft, Taylor joined the Minnesota Timberwolves for the 2007 NBA Summer League. He later signed with CB L'Hospitalet of the Spanish LEB Oro for the 2007–08 season.

In 2008, Taylor signed with Kepez Belediyesi of the Turkish Basketball League for the 2008–09 season. In December 2008, left Turkey and returned to Spain to play with Beirasar Rosalía.

In July 2009, he signed with STB Le Havre of the French League for the 2009–10 season. In February 2010, he left France and signed with Szolnoki Olaj of Hungary for the rest of the season.

On November 1, 2010, he was selected by the Iowa Energy in the 3rd round of the 2010 NBA D-League draft. On November 17, 2010, he was waived by the Energy. In January 2011, he signed with Keravnos of Cyprus for the rest of the 2010–11 season. He later left Keravnos after 2 games and joined Guerreros de Bogotá for the 2011 Baloncesto Profesional Colombiano season.

In January 2012, he signed with Panteras de Miranda for the 2012 LBP season. In February 2012, he left Panteras and signed with BC Dnipro-Azot for the rest of the 2011–12 season.

In July 2012, he re-joined the Minnesota Timberwolves for the 2012 NBA Summer League. In August 2012, he signed with Neckar RIESEN Ludwigsburg of the German Basketball Bundesliga. On January 21, 2013, he was released.

On September 30, 2013, he signed with the Boston Celtics. However, he was later waived by the Celtics on October 26, 2013. On October 31, 2013, he was acquired by the Maine Red Claws as an affiliate player. On January 4, 2014, he was waived by the Red Claws due to a season-ending knee injury.

In January 2015, he joined the Gigantes de Guayana of the Venezuelan Liga Profesional de Baloncesto. He left the team in late April, and in 28 games, he averaged 11.8 points, 2.2 rebounds and 2.6 assists per game.

On November 10, 2016, he signed with the Saint John Riptide for the  2016–17 NBL Canada season.

References

External links
NBA D-League profile

1984 births
Living people
African-American basketball players
American expatriate basketball people in Canada
American expatriate basketball people in Colombia
American expatriate basketball people in Cyprus
American expatriate basketball people in France
American expatriate basketball people in Germany
American expatriate basketball people in Hungary
American expatriate basketball people in Spain
American expatriate basketball people in Turkey
American expatriate basketball people in Ukraine
American expatriate basketball people in Venezuela
American men's basketball players
Basketball players from Minneapolis
BC Dnipro-Azot players
CB L'Hospitalet players
Maine Red Claws players
Kepez Belediyesi S.K. players
Keravnos B.C. players
Riesen Ludwigsburg players
Point guards
Saint John Riptide players
STB Le Havre players
Szolnoki Olaj KK players
Wisconsin Badgers men's basketball players
North Community High School alumni
21st-century African-American sportspeople
20th-century African-American people